Gornja vas may refer to several places: 

In Austria:
Oberdorf, Neuhaus, a settlement in the town of Neuhaus, known as Gornja vas in Slovene
Oberdörfl, a village in the town of Sankt Margareten im Rosental, known as Gornja vas in Slovene

In Croatia
Gornja Vas, Samobor, a settlement in the administrative territory of Samobor

In Slovenia:
Gornja Vas, Zreče, a settlement in the Municipality of Zreče
Gornja Vas, Šmarje pri Jelšah, a settlement in the Municipality of Šmarje pri Jelšah
Gornja Vas, Zakojca, a hamlet of Zakojca in the Municipality of Cerkno
Tenetiše, Litija, a settlement in the Municipality of Litija, formerly known as Gornja vas